Johan Gustav Carlsson (born 29 August 1986) is a Swedish former professional golfer.

Carlsson turned professional in 2011. He played on the Nordea Tour and Nordic Golf League.  In 2012, he finished second in the Nordic Golf League Order of Merit, to earn one of five places on the Challenge Tour in 2013.

Carlsson won his first Challenge Tour event in September 2013 at the Kazakhstan Open. He finished 2013 in fifth place in the Challenge Tour standings, graduating to the European Tour for 2014.

His best season on the European Tour was in 2016 when he finished 75th on the Order of Merit. His best individual performance came in 2017 when he finished third in the Saltire Energy Paul Lawrie Match Play. He retired from professional golf in 2020.

Professional wins (3)

Challenge Tour wins (1)

Nordic Golf League wins (2)

Team appearances
Amateur
European Youths' Team Championship (representing Sweden): 2006

See also
2013 Challenge Tour graduates

References

External links
 

San Diego State Aztec's profile

Swedish male golfers
San Diego State Aztecs men's golfers
European Tour golfers
Sportspeople from Gothenburg
1986 births
Living people
21st-century Swedish people